Ella Nelson (born 10 May 1994) is an Australian former sprinter specialising in the 200 metres.

She competed in the 200m and 4 × 100 m relay at the 2014 Commonwealth Games held in Glasgow, Scotland, the 200m at the 2015 World Championships in Beijing, China and the 2017 World Championships held in London. In Rio de Janeiro, Brazil she represented Australia in the 200 metres at the 2016 Summer Olympics where she ran a personal best of 22.50 in the semi finals finishing third just missing the final by 100th of a second but to place 9th in the event overall out of 72 competitors.

Nelson won the Women's Open Australian 200m championship in 2014, 2015 and 2016 and is the 6th fastest of all time ranked Australian over this distance.

In January 2021, she announced her retirement from professional sports.

International competitions

Diamond League Meets

Personal bests
Outdoor
100 metres – 11.42 (+1.7 m/s, Canberra 2016)
200 metres – 22.50 (+0.1 m/s, Rio de Janeiro 2016)

Indoor
60 meters - 7.48 (Flagstaff 2017)

References

External links
 

1994 births
Living people
Australian female sprinters
World Athletics Championships athletes for Australia
Athletes (track and field) at the 2014 Commonwealth Games
Athletes from Sydney
Athletes (track and field) at the 2016 Summer Olympics
Olympic athletes of Australia
Commonwealth Games competitors for Australia
Olympic female sprinters
20th-century Australian women
21st-century Australian women